Emerson Preparatory School (also known as Emerson) was a small private high school in Northwest Washington, D.C., founded in 1852 as the Emerson Institute. It was Washington's oldest co-ed college preparatory school. The school closed at the end of the 2020-21 school year.

The school was located inside the Clocktower Building in Dupont Circle. Emerson had occupied that location since 2019, after moving from a temporary location in the Twelfth Street YMCA Building. Before 2017, Emerson spent eighty years in their own building across from the American Enterprise Institute. Most students used WMATA to get to and from school.

Emerson Preparatory School was a member of the Association of Independent Maryland and DC Schools (AIMS).

History
Emerson was founded in the District of Columbia in 1852 by Charles Bedford Young, Ph.D., as a school to prepare Washington area boys for entrance to Harvard. It was named for George Barrell Emerson, a noted New England educator, author, and Harvard graduate. After the Civil War the school's graduates began to attend other colleges and universities, and, in 1920, Emerson became Washington's first coeducational preparatory school.

Emerson's school seal features an image of the U.S. Capitol dome and the date 1852. The school mascot is the owl, symbolizing wisdom.

In the two years leading up to the COVID-19 pandemic, Emerson moved locations twice, later under the guidance of a new Head of School. Much of the teaching staff was let go as the school adopted an online model in response to the pandemic. The school closed at the end of the 2020-21 school year, stating that conditions were not conducive to operating Emerson in a financially sustainable manner.

Academics and faculty
Emerson's model placed strong emphasis on small class sizes, typically never larger than ten students, as well as its use of the term system. The school's academic year was modeled after the British System and had two terms per year rather than two semesters. Courses were completed in full during each 4.5 month term. Each term's schedule of classes included four ninety-minute class periods per day, five days per week, along with a one-hour lunch period every day.

Student body
During its early history, Emerson had sports and drama teams.

Locations

Emerson first opened at 914 14th Street Northwest Washington DC near Franklin Square between K and I Streets. In 1928, Emerson moved to a new building at 1740 P Street NW between Massachusetts and New Hampshire Avenues. In 1933, Emerson moved to 1525 16th Street NW near Stead Park between Q and Church Streets. In 1937, Emerson moved to 1324 18th Street NW near Dupont Circle between Massachusetts and Connecticut Avenues. In 2017, Emerson moved to a temporary location, the fourth floor of the Thurgood Marshall Center for Service and Heritage. In 2019, Emerson moved to the fourth floor of the Clocktower Building in Dupont Circle (1718 Connecticut Avenue NW).

Notable alumni

Brian Baker, guitarist and founding member of Minor Threat
Brendan Canty, drummer for Fugazi
James M. Cutts, Medal of Honor recipient
William F. Gibson, noted science fiction writer and "noir-prophet" of cyberpunk
Jesse Root Grant, youngest son of Ulysses S. Grant (attended)
Ulysses S. Grant Jr., second son of Ulysses S. Grant (attended)
Evan Johns, Grammy nominated rockabilly guitarist 
Jared Leto, Academy Award winning actor and vocalist of the alternative rock band 30 Seconds To Mars
Bruce Magruder, U.S. Army major general
Cat Marnell, socialite and writer
John Sirica, United States district judge famous for role in Watergate (attended)

References

Dupont Circle
Educational institutions established in 1852
Private high schools in Washington, D.C.
Preparatory schools in Washington, D.C.
1852 establishments in Washington, D.C.